The Meadowlands Pace is a harness race for three-year-old pacers, held at the Meadowlands Racetrack, in East Rutherford, Bergen County, New Jersey, United States. It is the richest pacing race in the United States at $738,550 and second richest pacing race in North America, behind the $1,000,000 North America Cup at Mohawk Raceway.

Records 
 Most wins by a driver
 7 – John Campbell (1982, 1989, 1994, 1995, 1999, 2001, 2002)

 Most wins by a trainer
 4 – Brett Pelling (1995, 1997, 1999, 2005)

 Stakes record
 1:46 4/5 – He's Watching (2014) (equaled all-age World Record)

Meadowlands Pace winners

References

Meadowlands Racetrack
Harness races in the United States
Sports competitions in East Rutherford, New Jersey
Recurring sporting events established in 1977
1977 establishments in New Jersey